Hantu Gangster is a 2012 Malaysian horror comedy film directed by Namewee. The film stars Namewee, Amber Chia, Farid Kamil, Diana Danielle, Dato Jalaluddin Hassan, David Arumugam, Reshmonu and others.

Plot
In a small town located in Klang, a rogue named Te Sai (Namewee) steals a ring during a gangster's memorial ceremony, not knowing that it is haunted. The ring hosts the ghosts of three former gang leaders who begin to haunt Te Sai as he is carrying their ring. Te Sai soon finds out that the trio were killed by a traitor whose personal agenda threatens the very foundation of unity between the three gangs. Guided by the ghosts, Te Sai must now do what he can to unify the gangs and avoid a tragedy that may result in the deaths of many innocents.

Cast

References

External links 
 

Malaysian comedy horror films
2010s comedy horror films
Films directed by Namewee
Malay-language films
2010s Tamil-language films
Chinese-language Malaysian films
Films with screenplays by Namewee
2012 comedy films
2012 films
2010s English-language films
2010s Mandarin-language films
Tamil-language Malaysian films
2012 multilingual films
Malaysian multilingual films